Sir William Maule was the eldest son of Sir Peter Maule and Christina de Valognes, Baron and Baroness of Panmure and Benvie. William succeeded as Baron in 1254 on his father's death. He was married to Ethana de Vallibus, daughter of John Vaux, Lord of Dirleton, and left one son, Henry Maule, who succeeded him as Baron.

References

Scoto-Normans